The Battle of Bayrudh was fought between the Sasanians and the Rashidun Caliphate in 643/4. Before the battle took place, a group of Sasanian supporters rallied among a certain Piruz, who rebelled against the Rashiduns. They were, however, defeated at Bayrudh in 643/4.

Sources 
 

640s
Bayrudh
Rebellions against the Rashidun Caliphate
Muslim conquest of Persia